Chatsworth train accident can refer to two different train accidents in the United States:
2008 Chatsworth train collision in southern California
1887 Great Chatsworth train wreck in eastern Illinois